

Incumbents
President: Paul Biya
Prime Minister: Joseph Ngute

Events
February 9 – 2020 Cameroonian parliamentary election
February 14 – Anglophone Crisis: Ngarbuh massacre
August 2 – Boko Haram insurgency: Nguetchewe attack
October 24 - Anglophone Crisis: Kumba school massacre
December 27 – Thirty-seven are killed and 18 are injured in a bus crash in Nemale.

Deaths

April 12 – Samuel Wembé
July 5 – Samuel Wazizi, journalist (CMTV); died while in government retention.
July 10 – Jacob Plange-Rhule, doctor, head of district hospital in Yaounde; COVID-19

References

 
Cameroon
2020s in Cameroon
Years of the 21st century in Cameroon